Christian Marletta was accused of rape, murder and dismemberment of Christelle Bancourt, a twelve-year-old girl, in Marseille. Marletta was convicted and sentenced to life imprisonment in 1985. He was released in 2006.

Disappearance
Christelle Bancourt had gone missing at around 6:20 pm on June 10, 1982 while she was close to the "Le Bois Fleuri" fireplace, while she was going to the dentist. No one saw or heard anything.

Bancourt murdered after being kidnapped
Marletta had said that he went to the Bois Fleuri foyer, where he saw Christelle. Then, he said, he came back some time later and saw the girl again. Christian Marletta, who knew her, offered to bring her home and a few minutes later they had a slight accident, during which Christelle fell and passed out.

Christian Marletta brings Christelle home to take care of her. He puts her on her bed and Christelle looks at him strangely because she knows she shouldn't be there. Then seized with a feeling of panic, Christian Marletta, according to his confession, would have strangled Christelle until she was no longer breathing. He then allegedly took her to the bathroom to undress her, then decided to skin her body with knives and a chopper. On the other hand, Christian Marletta denies the rape, when the police tell him that Christelle has been raped.

Christian Marletta says at the same time that he left the garbage bags in the parking lot of a supermarket and that the other garbage bags were thrown into the sea at Pointe Rouge, south of Marseille. The police searched the Bay for hours, but found nothing.

Investigation
In the meantime, a week after Christelle's disappearance, a human trunk is discovered in a garbage bag in the parking lot of the Carrefour le Merlan hypermarket, about ten kilometers from the "Le Bois Fleuri" home. The autopsy shows that the trunk would belong to a girl aged 8 to 10 years: even if Christelle was 12 years old, she was younger than her age. Moreover, the young girl would have been raped and sodomized and the butchering allows to affirm that it is a professional who carried out this work. 

The police then go to seek out suspect Christian Marletta. After being questioned, he denies being responsible for Christelle's disappearance. The police then take him to the morgue to confront him with Christelle's body Back at the Police Station, the police presented him with the garbage bags in which Christelle's trunk was discovered. Christian Marletta admits that these trash bags belong to him and confesses to having murdered Christelle.

Discovery of body and aftermath
In July 1982, an arm, a leg as well as a head were found near Pointe Rouge and after examination the head turned out to be that of Christelle Bancourt. The autopsy performed on June 17, 1982 on the other members of Christelle's body revealed that she was killed no later than 36 hours before the discovery of the body (on June 15, 1982) and no earlier than 4 days before (on June 13, 1982). For the defense lawyers, if Christelle was killed between June 13 and June 15, 1982, that exonerates Marletta since the latter was in Lot 3.

During the investigation, the police learned that Christian Marletta was accused in 1980 of having practiced sexual touching on Christelle's twin sister, Chantal. At the time, the director of the home did not believe Chantal and there was no investigation. However, according to Chantal, Christelle was undoubtedly murdered because Christian Marletta wanted revenge for this accusation.

Christian Marletta is imprisoned in the Baumettes prison after having repeated his confessions twice before the Public Prosecutor and the Examining Magistrate. In prison, Christian Marletta receives a visit from several psychiatric experts, to whom he tells several versions. He first says that he did not kill Christelle and that he discovered her body in front of her door. Panicked, he would have cut up the body before throwing the remains in Pointe Rouge and in the supermarket parking lot. In another version given to the examining magistrate on July 5, he said he received a phone call ordering him to throw away the body parts, otherwise his wife and son would have serious problems. Its lawyers emphasize the absence of reconstitution and the rejection of several requests for documents.

The Trial
On March 12, 1985, the trial of Christian Marletta began. This one seems foreign to the file and despite the testimony of his friends and his family, who make him a laudatory portrait, he does not convince anyone when he declares not to have killed Christelle. Defense lawyers argue that Marletta's apartment was clean when the police searched it: if Christian Marletta had killed Christelle, splashes of blood would have been found on the wall or on the floor while he was not. there weren't any. Apart from a flap of skin found in the shower, there is no material evidence to accuse Christian Marletta.

Marletta declares that he no longer knew what he was doing and that he broke down in the face of pressure from the police, especially when he was taken to the morgue to face Christelle's corpse. In addition, for the police Marletta is guilty, because only the murderer knew the exact location of the garbage bags and the latter described the place where the human remains were.

Prison time and aftermath
Marletta was finally sentenced to life imprisonment on March 15, 1985 by the Aix-en-Provence Assize Court, and was imprisoned in Arles prison, Christian Marletta asks for a review of his trial with the help of Gilbert Collard. An association was formed in its favor, including the Human Rights Committee of Châteauroux, which provides its support. His cassation appeal was dismissed on October 30, 1985.

Christian Marletta was released from prison in 2006, and is now leading a new life with his partner whom he met in prison

TV documentary
On a documentary titled Enter the accused, that was presented by Christophe Hondelatte, in January 2008 and September 2009. Christian Marletta had written to Christophe Hondelatte to ask him to renounce the broadcast of the program considering it defamatory and harmful to his reintegration on his release from prison. The program noting both the elements that overwhelm Christian Marletta and the gray areas pointed out by the defense and other unusual methods used by the Marseille police at the time, his request was not heard.

See also
List of kidnappings
List of solved missing person cases

References

1980s missing person cases
1982 crimes in France
Female murder victims
Formerly missing people
Crime in Provence-Alpes-Cote d'Azur
History of Marseille
Incidents of violence against girls
Kidnapped French children
Missing person cases in France
Murder in France
Rape in France